Lucrecia Ngui Engonga (born 24 October 1988), simply known as Lucrecia, is an Equatoguinean footballer who plays as a midfielder. She is a member of the Equatorial Guinea women's national football team. She was part of the team at the 2011 FIFA Women's World Cup.

References

External links
 

1988 births
Living people
People from Mongomo
Equatoguinean women's footballers
Women's association football midfielders
Equatorial Guinea women's international footballers
2011 FIFA Women's World Cup players